Live at the Hammersmith Odeon is a live album by thrash metal band Nuclear Assault, released in 1992. This is the straight audio copy of Nuclear Assault's video Handle With Care, but some tracks were excluded from the compact disc version.

Track listing
 "Intro / New Song"
 "Critical Mass"
 "Game Over"
 "Nightmares"
 "Butt Fuck"
 "Survive"
 "Torture Tactics"
 "Trail of Tears"
 "Mother's Day"
 "My America"
 "Hang the Pope"
 "Lesbians"
 "Funky Noise"
 "Good Times Bad Times"

References

Nuclear Assault albums
1992 live albums
Albums recorded at the Hammersmith Apollo